The Agroforestry Research Trust (ART) is a British charitable incorporated organisation that researches temperate agroforestry and all aspects of plant cropping and uses, with a focus on tree, shrub and perennial crops. It produces several publications and a quarterly journal, and sells plants and seeds from its forest gardens.

The trust is managed by Martin Crawford, and has a  forest garden, next to the Schumacher College in Dartington, Devon, in the United Kingdom. It makes heavy use of ground cover plants to restrict the growth of weeds.

See also
Forest gardening

Further reading
 Crawford, Martin (2010). Creating a Forest Garden: Working with Nature to Grow Edible Crops

References

External links
 
 List of visitable forest garden and agroforestry projects in the UK, Europe and North America

Charities based in Devon
Agroforestry
Forest research institutes